Fanling Airstrip was a military airstrip in the race course, Fanling, New Territories, Hong Kong.

In May 1949, when the 1st Independent Field Squadron of the Royal Engineers arrived from British Malaya, they built a temporary military airstrip on the ninth fairway (located at the Hong Kong Golf Club's fairway to number 9 hole), let the 2-seater spotter aircraft of the Royal Artillery to use for patrolling the British-Sino boundary for a few weeks before moving on (the unit departed Hong Kong in February 1950).

The airfield disappeared when the Golf Course resumed operations in the early 1950s.

See also

 List of airports in Hong Kong
 Former Overseas RAF Stations
 Hong Kong Aviation Club

References

Further reading
 Hong Kong “Wah Kiu Yat Po”, 10 September 1949 (Saturday)

External links
 Fanling Golf Course

Defunct airports in the United Kingdom
Airports in Hong Kong
Military of Hong Kong under British rule
Fanling
Former buildings and structures in Hong Kong
Military of Hong Kong